The Protocols of the Elders of Zion is a fabricated antisemitic text purporting to describe a Jewish plan to achieve global domination.  The text was fabricated in the Russian Empire, and was first published in 1903. While there is continued popularity of The Protocols in nations from South America to Asia, since the defeat of Nazi Germany, Fascist Italy, and Imperial Japan in World War II, governments or political leaders in most parts of the world have generally avoided claims that The Protocols represent factual evidence of a real Jewish conspiracy. The exception to this is the Middle East, where a large number of Arab and Muslim regimes and leaders have endorsed them as authentic. Past endorsements of The Protocols from Presidents Gamal Abdel Nasser and Anwar Sadat of Egypt, Iraqi President Arif, King Faisal of Saudi Arabia, and Colonel Muammar al-Gaddafi of Libya, among other political and intellectual leaders of the Arab world, are echoed by 21st century endorsements from the Grand Mufti of Jerusalem, Sheikh Ekrima Sa'id Sabri, and Hamas, to the education ministry of Saudi Arabia.

Middle East
As popular opposition to Israel spread across the Middle East in the years following its creation in 1948, many Arab governments funded new printings of the Protocols and taught them in their schools as historical fact. They have been accepted as such by many Islamist organizations, such as Hamas and Islamic Jihad. A 2005 report by the Intelligence and Terrorism Information Center found that Arabic editions issued in the Middle East were being sold as far away as London. There are at least nine different Arabic translations of the Protocols and more editions than in any other language including German. The Protocols also figure prominently in the antisemitic propaganda distributed internationally by the Arab countries and have spread to other Muslim countries, such as Pakistan, Malaysia, and Indonesia.

Syria
The Protocols, together with other antisemitic materials published there, is distributed throughout the Arab world.
In 1997, the two-volume 8th edition of the Protocols, translated and edited by 'Ajaj Nuwaihed, was published by Mustafa Tlass's publishing house and exhibited and sold at the Damascus International Book Fair (IBF) and at the Cairo IBF. At the 2005 Cairo IBF, a stand of the Syrian publisher displayed a new, 2005 edition of the Protocols authorized by the Syrian Ministry of Information. In Syria, government-controlled television channels occasionally broadcast mini-series concerning the Protocols of the Elders of Zion, along with several other anti-semitic themes.

Egypt
The Protocols were featured in a 1960 article published by Salah Dasuqi, military governor of Cairo, in al-Majallaaa, the official cultural journal. In 1965, the Egyptian government released an English-language pamphlet titled Israel, the Enemy of Africa and distributed it throughout the English-speaking countries of Africa. The pamphlet used the Protocols and The International Jew as its sources and concluded that all the Jews were cheats, thieves, and murderers.

Iran
The first Iranian edition of the Protocols was issued during the summer of 1978 before the Iranian Revolution after which the Protocols were widely publicized by the Iranian government. A publication called Imam, published by the Iranian embassy in London, quoted extensively from the Protocols in its issues of 1984 and 1985. In 1985 a new edition of the Protocols was printed and widely distributed by the Islamic Propagation Organization, International Relations Department, in Tehran. The Astan Quds Razavi Foundation in Mashhad, Iran, one of the wealthiest institutions in Iran, financed publication of the Protocols in 1994. Parts of the Protocols were published by the daily Jomhouri-e Eslami in 1994, under the heading The Smell of Blood, Zionist Schemes. Sobh, a far right monthly newspaper, published excerpts from the Protocols under the heading The text of the Protocols of the Elders of Zion for establishing the Jewish global rule in its December 1998 – January 1999 issue, illustrated with a caricature of the Jewish snake swallowing the globe.

Iranian writer and researcher Ali Baqeri, who researched the Protocols, finds their plan for world domination to be merely part of an even more grandiose scheme, saying in Sobh in 1999:
"The ultimate goal of the Jews ... after conquering the globe ... is to extract from the hands of the Lord many stars and galaxies".

In April 2004, the Iranian television station Al-Alam broadcast Al-Sameri wa Al-Saher, a series that reported as fact several conspiracy theories about the Holocaust, Jewish control of Hollywood, and the Protocols. The Iran Pavilion of the 2005 Frankfurt Book Fair had the Protocols, as well as The International Jew available. In 2008 The Secret of Armageddon, an Iranian TV "documentary" claiming that "a Jewish Plan for the Genocide of Humanity," includes a conspiracy for the takeover of Iran by local Jewish and Baháʼí Faith communities was based on the Protocols.

On the other hand, Iranian author Abdollah Shahbazi, known for his historical reports of several important events of Iran's history, has denied the authenticity of the Protocols officially on his website and has referred to several international investigations as the basis of his claim.

Palestinian National Authority

According to Itamar Marcus the PNA frequently used the Protocols in the media and education under their control and some Palestinian academics presented the forgery as a plot upon which Zionism is based. For example, on January 25, 2001, the official PNA daily Al-Hayat al-Jadida cited the Protocols on its Political National Education page to explain Israel's policies:
Disinformation has been one of the bases of moral and psychological manipulation among the Israelis ... The Protocols of the Elders of Zion did not ignore the importance of using propaganda to promote the Zionist goals. The second protocol reads: "Through the newspapers we will have the means to propel and to influence". In the twelfth protocol: "Our governments will hold the reins of most of the newspapers, and through this plan we will possess the primary power to turn to public opinion."
Later that year the same newspaper wrote: "The purpose of the military policy is to impose this situation on the residents and force them to leave their homes, and this is done in the framework of the Protocols of Zion..."

The Grand Mufti of Jerusalem Sheikh Ekrima Sa'id Sabri appeared on the Saudi satellite channel Al-Majd on February 20, 2005, commenting on the assassination of the former Lebanese Prime Minister Rafik Hariri. "Anyone who studies The Protocols of the Elders of Zion and specifically the Talmud," he said, "will discover that one of the goals of these Protocols is to cause confusion in the world and to undermine security throughout the world."

In 2005, it was reported that the Palestinian Authority was referring to the Protocols in a textbook for 10th grade students. After media exposure, the PA issued a revised edition of the textbook that does not include references to the Protocols.

The New York Times reported that Palestinian Authority Minister of Information Nabil Shaath removed an Arabic translation of the Protocols of the Elders of Zion from his ministry's website.

Europe
In August 2012, the Conference of European Rabbis appealed to Apple Inc to stop selling an Arabic-language version of The Protocols of the Elders of Zion which was being sold via iTunes.  Rabbi Pinchas Goldschmidt explained that to "disseminate such hateful invective as a mobile app is dangerous and inexcusable."  Yuli Edelstein, Israel's Minister of Public Information and Diaspora Affairs, supported the appeal, explaining that "they wouldn't allow pedophilia and pornography on their networks.  They shouldn't allow xenophobia, anti-Semitism or racism."

Greece
The Protocols is published in Greece by several ultra-right-wing publishers such as Ouranos and Mpimpis. During the last decade, the book has received wide promotion by parliamentary right-wing extremists, most notably Kyriakos Velopoulos.

Italy
In 2010, an Italian editor has been convicted on charges of libel for publishing the Protocols. He had been sued by the Jewish community of Turin.

North America

United States
The Protocols have had a tumultuous history in the United States ever since Henry Ford began publishing extracts and commentaries of them in The Dearborn Independents column The International Jew. Later, he reprinted the commentaries in a multi-volume series, also called The International Jew.

The Protocols were republished as fact in 1991 in Milton William Cooper's conspiracy book Behold a Pale Horse, though Cooper himself holds the Illuminati and not the Jews at fault.

The American retail chain Wal-Mart was criticized for selling The Protocols of the Elders of Zion on its website with a description that suggested it might be genuine. It was withdrawn from sale in September 2004, as 'a business decision'. It was distributed in the United States by Louis Farrakhan's Nation of Islam.

In 2002, the Paterson, New Jersey-based Arabic language newspaper The Arab Voice published excerpts from the Protocols as true.
The paper's editor and publisher Walid Rabah defended himself from criticism with the protestation that "some major writers in the Arab nation accept the truth of the book."

In 2011, Christian writer and conspiracy theorist Texe Marrs published an edition of the Protocols, with a foreword of his own authorship and additional notes by Henry Ford.

Soviet Union and post-Soviet states

The Soviet Union
Howard Sachar describes the allegations of global Jewish conspiracy resurrected during the Soviet "anti-Zionist" campaign in the wake of the Six-Day War:
In late July 1967, Moscow launched an unprecedented propaganda campaign against Zionism as a "world threat." Defeat was attributed not to tiny Israel alone, but to an "all-powerful international force" ... In its flagrant vulgarity, the new propaganda assault soon achieved Nazi-era characteristics. The Soviet public was saturated with racist canards. Extracts from Trofim Kichko's notorious 1963 volume, Judaism Without Embellishment, were extensively republished in the Soviet media. Yuri Ivanov's Beware: Zionism, a book essentially replicated The Protocols of the Elders of Zion, was given nationwide coverage.

The Russian Federation
Despite stipulations against fomenting hatred based on ethnic or religious grounds (Article 282 of Russia Penal Code), the Protocols have enjoyed numerous reprints in the nationalist press after the dissolution of the Soviet Union.
In 2003, one century after the first publication of the Protocols, an article in the most popular Russian weekly Argumenty i Fakty referred to it as a "peculiar bible of Zionism" and showed a photo of the First Zionist Congress of 1897. The co-president of the National-Patriot Union of Russia Alexander Prokhanov wrote: "It does not matter whether the Protocols are a forgery or a factual conspiracy document." The article also contained refutation of the allegations by the president of the Russian Jewish congress Yevgeny Satanovsky.

As recently as 2005, the Protocols was "a frequent feature in Patriarchate churches".  On January 27, 2006, members of the Public Chamber of Russia and human rights activists proposed to establish a list of extremist literature whose dissemination should be formally banned for uses other than scientific research.

By the decision of the Leninsky City District Court of Orenburg dated 26 July 2010, the Protocols of the Elders of Zion was considered an extremist publication. However, the court did not ban the work itself as such, but the pamphlet. According to the national standard of the Russian Federation (ГОСТ 7.60-2003), a pamphlet means a book publication with a volume of more than 4, but not more than 48 pages.
 
In March 2011, the Russian human rights movement 'For Human Rights' and member of the Civic Chamber of the Russian Federation Alla Gerber appealed to the prosecutor's office of the Northern Administrative Okrug of Moscow with a demand to stop the distribution of the Protocols. The prosecutor's office rejected the demand stating that the Institute of Psychology of the Russian Academy of Sciences conducted a psycholinguistic and socio-psychological examination of the texts. According to conclusions of the experts, Protocols has a critical historical-educational and political-educational focus and that "there is no information in the book that encourages action against other nationalities, social and religious groups or individuals as its representatives."

In April 2011, the Ministry of Foreign Affairs of Russia placed an order for the supply of sets of spiritual and moral literature to Russian diplomatic missions, which included the books The Great within the Small and Antichrist by Sergei Nilus, the Protocols and other antisemitic publications, which resulted in public outcry. In May 2011, Evgeny Velikhov, head of the Civic Chamber of the Russian Federation, wrote a letter to Prosecutor-General of Russia Yury Chaika, demanding the labelling of the Protocols as extremist,  in order to get it banned from publication.

In November 2012, the Protocols was added to the Federal List of Extremist Materials under the entry number 1496 by the decision of the Leninsky City District Court of Orenburg.

Asia

Malaysia
The Protocols have been in circulation in Malaysia since 1983. Mahathir Mohamad distributed copies of The Protocols during his years in office as prime minister of the country. In 2006, Masterpiece Publications issued a version of the Protocols under the title World Conquest Through World Jewish Government.

Pakistan
A edition was published with the title Jewish conspiracy and the Muslim world under the editorship of Misbahul Islam Faruqi in the late 1960s and republished in 2001.

Other contemporary appearances
To a great degree, the text is still accepted as truthful in the Middle East, South America, and Asia, especially in Japan where variations on the Protocols have frequently made the bestseller lists.

In Turkey, The Protocols are particularly popular with ultra-nationalist and Islamist circles. The Protocols was first published in the magazine Millî İnkılâp (National Revolution) in 1934 and triggered the Thracian pogroms (Trakya Olayları) the same year. It ran through over 100 editions from 1943 to 2004 and remains a best-seller.

In Romania, The Protocols was published in the early 1990s by nationalist writers and neo-Legionary groups as Protocoalele înțelepților Sionului. It was widely read in urban areas and mentioned by the people who were disappointed by the new economic rules and inflation.

The New Zealand National Front sells copies published by their former national secretary, Kerry Bolton. Bolton also publishes (and the NZNF sells) a book titled The Protocols of Zion in Context that seeks to refute the idea that the Protocols are a forgery.

In Indonesia, a translation of the Protocols is available in Indonesian in a bundle with The International Jew. The books were translated and published in 2006 by the Hikmah division of the publisher Mizan.

References

External links

Protocols of the Elders of Zion